Phobia is a character appearing in American comic books published by DC Comics. She is usually depicted as an enemy of the Teen Titans.

Publication history
Phobia first appeared in New Teen Titans #14 and was created by Marv Wolfman and George Pérez.

Fictional character biography
Born a member of the British aristocracy with the power to make people experience their worst fears, Angela Hawkins III was a "bad seed" who rejected any help from her family. 

When the Brain came to London to recruit her for the reformation of the Brotherhood of Evil, Angela readily agreed. She joined the New Brotherhood of Evil in the hopes of conquering her own fears by unleashing those of others. Sometimes, man-hating tendencies rise up in her. Angela suffers from a fear of being alone. Phobia and the Brotherhood have opposed the Teen Titans on numerous occasions.

Phobia travels to New Zealand. In the course of murderous crimes, Phobia coincidentally encounters the bestial super-hero Tasmanian Devil. Sensing her killings, Tasmanian Devil and his New Zealand contact and confidante Raylene Mackenzie tail her. A fight ensues. Tasmanian Devil was initially immune to Phobia's powers, because his bestial nature was so near the surface. She dug deeper, however, uncovering his fear of his dominating and abusive mother. Tasmanian Devil relives a particular incident where his father was degraded and hit. Raylene attempts to help and was hit with her own fear—drowning. Despite this, they manage to work together, subduing Phobia with blows to the head. Tasmanian Devil becomes famous in New Zealand because of his efforts to protect Raylene.

A later encounter with Raven forces Phobia confront the fears and insecurities that lay within herself, which stemmed from childhood issues with her father, Lord Hawkins. It appeared Phobia might reform and abandon her criminal ways following this encounter.

During the Crisis on Infinite Earths storyline, Phobia was given the task of using her powers to mentally torture the bound and gagged members of the Marvel Family. She was later defeated offpanel when the Atom removes the gag from Billy Batson's mouth, allowing him to transform.

Phobia is one of the many super-villains who go on a rampage when the Joker infects them with a serum causing them to become more like him. She then spends time in the villain-friendly fictional country of Zandia.

Phobia later resurfaced back with the Brotherhood, now calling themselves the Society of Sin. She also accepted an invitation to join the Secret Society of Super Villains in Villains United, though those who do not accept such invitations tend to wind up dead. Phobia was seen as a member of the Injustice League.

Phobia appeared in two story arcs in Manhunter (Mark Andreyko), first as one of the supervillains recruited by Calculator to take out the Shadow-Thief. In this storyline, she accidentally bumped into Kate Spencer and awakened Kate's fear of causing the death of her son, Ramsey (who, at this point in time, was still recovering from injuries that were inflicted on him by Kate's staff). The Manhunter had psi-shielding in her costume, however, and was able to overpower Phobia in a battle in the LA District Courthouse. In her second appearance, Phobia was assisting Kate Spencer's father in some illegal medical procedure. Manhunter tracked down her father and encountered Phobia on the first floor of the house the two were occupying. After a pitched battle, Kate defeats her again.

Phobia is part of a group effort that successfully destroys the fictional city of Bludhaven, killing millions.

She is one of the villains featured in Salvation Run.

Phobia is one of the villains sent to retrieve the Get Out of Hell free card from the Secret Six. Following the Final Crisis, Phobia was seen as a member of Cheetah's Secret Society of Super Villains. She is later attacked by Wonder Woman's foe Genocide.

Phobia is seen attacking the remaining members of the Titans following the aftermath of Justice League: Cry for Justice. She infiltrates the Titans compound in New York City, first using her abilities to force Cyborg to relive the massacre of his Titans East squad, and then defeating Starfire by exploiting her fear of being alone. She is ultimately defeated after Cyborg is able to overcome his illusion, which causes Phobia to break her concentration and allow Starfire to knock her unconscious. Just prior to turning her over to the authorities, Starfire speculates that Phobia had attacked the heroes for sport upon hearing of the team's fractured state.

In September 2011, The New 52 rebooted DC's continuity. In this new timeline, Phobia first appears in the Blue Beetle #1. As a member of the Brotherhood of Evil, she is seen looking for the scarab alongside Plasmus and Warp while competing with La Dama's agents.

Powers and abilities
Phobia's natural born psychic powers allow her complete and total mastery over the fear centers of the human mind. She is able to probe into the psyches of her victims, discovering the things they most fear and then manifesting those fears in their minds with illusions.

In other media
 Phobia makes non-speaking appearances in Teen Titans as part of the Brotherhood of Evil. She joins them in their plot to eliminate young heroes around the world, only to be flash-frozen by the Teen Titans.
 Phobia appears in issue #55 of Teen Titans Go! as a member of the Brotherhood of Evil.

References

Comics characters introduced in 1981
Characters created by George Pérez
Characters created by Marv Wolfman
DC Comics female supervillains
DC Comics metahumans 
DC Comics characters who have mental powers
Fictional illusionists
Fictional British people